Stefan Babinsky (born 2 April 1996) is an Austrian alpine skiing coach and former alpine skier.

Career
During his career he has achieved three results among the top 10 in the FIS Alpine Ski World Cup.

World Cup results
Top 10

References

External links
 
 

1996 births
Living people
Austrian male alpine skiers